Francis Jones (November 1, 1815 – August 2, 1887) was an Ontario civil engineer, provincial land surveyor and political figure. He represented Leeds North and Grenville North in the House of Commons of Canada as a Conservative member from 1867 to 1874.

He was born in Ballykilleen, County Carlow, Ireland in 1815, the son of Edward Jones and Rowanna Sparling. He was an unsuccessful candidate for a seat in the Legislative Assembly of the Province of Canada in 1854 before being elected for North Leeds and Grenville in 1861 and 1863. He was elected again following Confederation and served until he was defeated in 1874. Jones ran unsuccessfully for reelection again in 1878. He lived in Kemptville and died there at the age of 71. Jones never married.

References 

1815 births
1887 deaths
Members of the Legislative Assembly of the Province of Canada from Canada West
Conservative Party of Canada (1867–1942) MPs
Members of the House of Commons of Canada from Ontario